Lesbian, gay, bisexual, and transgender (LGBT) persons in  Djibouti face legal challenges not experienced by non-LGBT residents. LGBT persons face stigmatization among the broader population.

Legality of same-sex sexual activity
The legality of same-sex sexual activity is ambiguous in Djibouti. Although is no law that mentions that same-sex sexual activity is legal or illegal, this doesn't prevent the authorities to prosecute the public display of same-sex sexual conduct under laws prohibiting attacks on “good morals".

Government opinion

In June 2011, the UN Human Rights Council passed a resolution against human rights violations based on sexual orientation and gender identity (IGLHRC 17 June 2011; Human Rights Brief 10 Nov. 2011). Sources indicate that Djibouti voted against the resolution (ibid.; IGLHRC 17 June 2011).

Living conditions
The U.S. Department of State's 2015 Human Rights Report found that "there were no known reports of societal violence or discrimination based on sexual orientation. Societal norms did not allow for the public discussion of homosexuality, and persons did not openly acknowledge having a homosexual orientation."

Summary table

See also 

 Human rights in Djibouti
 LGBT rights in Africa

References

Human rights in Djibouti
Djibouti
Djibouti
Law of Djibouti
Politics of Djibouti
Gender in Djibouti